Carlos Eduardo Cermeño Uzcategui (born 8 August 1995) is a Venezuelan footballer who plays for Metropolitanos.

Career

Cermeño began his career with Monagas in the Venezuelan first division in 2011. He played four matches before being transferred to Venezuelan first division club, Deportivo Táchira in 2013. In February 2017, FC Dallas loaned in Cermeño from Deportivo Táchira.

International
Carlos participated in the 2014 Central American and Caribbean Games and 2015 South American Youth Football Championship.

He made his full national team debut on March 24, 2016.

Honours

Club
Deportivo Táchira
Venezuelan Primera Division: 2014/15

References

External links
 Carlos Cermeño in Soccerway
 Carlos Cermeño in National Football Teams

Venezuelan footballers
Deportivo Táchira F.C. players
Monagas S.C. players
Living people
1995 births
People from Monagas
FC Dallas players
Expatriate soccer players in the United States
Major League Soccer players
Association football midfielders
Venezuelan expatriate sportspeople in the United States